Colonel Robert Sheldon Scott (November 30, 1913 – February 5, 1999) was a soldier of the United States Army who received the Medal of Honor for actions during World War II. He was born in Washington, D. C., and graduated from the University of New Mexico in 1937 with a degree in English.  In September 1941, Scott was drafted into the US Army.  After attending Officer's Candidate School he received a commission.

Scott, who was a Second Lieutenant at the time of his action, was a member of the 172nd Infantry Regiment of the 43rd Infantry Division that successfully captured the Munda Point airstrip on the island of New Georgia, Solomon Islands from its Japanese defenders in the summer of 1943. On July 29, 1943 Japanese soldiers counter-attacked against the American assault on Morrison-Johnson Hill overlooking the airfield. Scott commanded the 3rd platoon, "C" Company, that he led into attack against the Japanese fortified position. 75 yards from the enemy soldiers, Scott became detached from the rest of his men. Despite being alone, being shot in the left hand and receiving a shrapnel wound to the head, Scott used the combination of his M1 carbine and grenades to kill 28 Japanese soldiers, causing the rest of the attacking soldiers to withdraw. Scott's colleagues consequently took the hill and later the airstrip.

He was awarded the Medal of Honor in October 1944 at Aitape, New Guinea. In 1997 New Mexico, his home state, declared November 30 Robert Scott Day in his honor. He died at his home in Santa Fe on February 5, 1999, aged 85.

He is buried in Santa Fe National Cemetery Santa Fe, New Mexico. His grave can be found in Plot: 9-460.

Medal of Honor citation
Rank and organization: Captain (then Lieutenant), U.S. Army, 172d Infantry, 43d Infantry Division. Place and date. Near Munda Air Strip, New Georgia, Solomon Islands, 29 July 1943. Entered service at. Santa Fe, N. Mex. Birth: Washington, D.C. G.O. No.: 81, 14 October 1944.

See also

List of Medal of Honor recipients
List of Medal of Honor recipients for World War II

References

1913 births
1999 deaths
United States Army Medal of Honor recipients
United States Army personnel of World War II
People from Santa Fe, New Mexico
United States Army officers
World War II recipients of the Medal of Honor
Burials at Santa Fe National Cemetery